Hot on the One is a 1980 live double album by James Brown. Recorded in Tokyo, it was Brown's next-to-last album for Polydor Records.

Track listing

References

James Brown live albums
1980 live albums